Robert Douglas Carswell, Baron Carswell, PC (born 28 June 1934) is a retired Lord of Appeal in Ordinary.

Early life 
The son of Alan and Nance Carswell was educated at the Royal Belfast Academical Institution and Pembroke College, Oxford, where he received a Bachelor of Arts and Master of Arts in classics and law in 1956. Two years later he graduated from the University of Chicago Law School with a Juris Doctor.

Legal career 
Carswell was Counsel to the Attorney General for Northern Ireland in the years 1969 and 1971, and Senior Crown Counsel in Northern Ireland from 1979 to 1984. In 1984, he became Judge of the High Court of Justice Northern Ireland, a post he held until 1992. He was Lord Justice of Appeal at the Supreme Court of Judicature in Northern Ireland from 1992 to 1997 and further Lord Chief Justice of Northern Ireland from 1997 to 2004. Lord Carswell was made a Queen's Counsel in 1971.

Carswell became a Privy Counsellor in 1993. He was appointed a Lord of Appeal in Ordinary as Baron Carswell, of Killeen in the County of Down on 12 January 2004, having been knighted in 1988. He sat in the House of Lords as a crossbencher until his retirement from the membership of the House on 29 October 2019.

During 2009–2010, Lord Carswell chaired an inquiry into the roles of Jersey's Crown Officers (the Bailiff, Deputy Bailiff, Attorney General and Solicitor General), presenting a report recommending reforms to the States of Jersey on 6 December 2010.

Family
Lord Carswell married Romayne Winifred Ferris in 1961; they have two daughters.

Lady Carswell was appointed Lord Lieutenant of Belfast in 2000.

See also
 List of Northern Ireland Members of the House of Lords
 List of Northern Ireland members of the Privy Council

References

External links

 

1934 births
Alumni of Pembroke College, Oxford
Knights Bachelor
Law lords 
Living people
Members of the Privy Council of the United Kingdom
University of Chicago Law School alumni
People educated at the Royal Belfast Academical Institution
Lord chief justices of Northern Ireland
Members of the Judicial Committee of the Privy Council
Lords Justice of Appeal of Northern Ireland
High Court judges of Northern Ireland
Crossbench life peers
Northern Ireland King's Counsel